Daddala quadrisignata is a species of moth in the family Erebidae first described by Francis Walker in 1865.

Distribution
It is found in the Himalayas of India, Thailand, Malaysia, Sumatra and Borneo.

References

Sypnini
Moths of Asia